Independence USD 446 is a public unified school district headquartered in Independence, Kansas, United States.  The district includes the communities of Independence, Elk City, Sycamore, and nearby rural areas.

Schools
The school district operates the following schools:
 Independence High School
 Independence Middle School
 Jefferson Elementary School
 Eisenhower Elementary School
 Riley Early Learning Center

See also
 Kansas State Department of Education
 Kansas State High School Activities Association
 List of high schools in Kansas
 List of unified school districts in Kansas

References

External links
 

School districts in Kansas